Maurice William Rich (20 January 1932 – 22 October 2022) was an Australian athlete. He competed in the men's triple jump at the 1956 Summer Olympics.

Rich died on 22 October 2022, at the age of 90.

References

External links
 

1932 births
2022 deaths
Place of birth missing
Athletes (track and field) at the 1956 Summer Olympics
Athletes (track and field) at the 1958 British Empire and Commonwealth Games
Australian male triple jumpers
Commonwealth Games competitors for Australia
Olympic athletes of Australia